Mariana de los Ángeles Benavides Arguedas (born 26 December 1994) is a Costa Rican footballer who play as a defender.

Honours 
Costa Rica
Winner
 Central American Games: 2013

References

External links
 
 Profile  at Fedefutbol
 

1994 births
Living people
Women's association football defenders
Costa Rican women's footballers
People from Heredia (canton)
Costa Rica women's international footballers
2015 FIFA Women's World Cup players
Pan American Games bronze medalists for Costa Rica
Pan American Games medalists in football
Footballers at the 2019 Pan American Games
Footballers at the 2015 Pan American Games
Central American Games gold medalists for Costa Rica
Central American Games medalists in football
Medalists at the 2019 Pan American Games